Platylestes is a genus of stalk-winged damselflies in the family Lestidae. There are at least five described species in Platylestes.

Species
These four species belong to the genus Platylestes:

References

Further reading

 
 
 

Lestidae
Articles created by Qbugbot